San Cosme Department is a  department of Corrientes Province in Argentina.

Settlements
Paso de la Patria
San Cosme
Santa Ana

Departments of Corrientes Province